Scalatra is a free and open source web application framework written in Scala. It is a port of the Sinatra framework written in Ruby. Scalatra is an alternative to the Lift, Play!, and Unfiltered frameworks.

Scalatra is an example of a microframework, a web software development framework which attempts to be as minimal as possible.

A full Scalatra application can be written in very few lines of code:

package org.example.app

import org.scalatra._

class MyScalatraFilter extends ScalatraFilter {

  get("/hello/:name") {
    <h1>Hello, {params("name")}</h1>
  }
}

From this tiny domain-specific language, Scalatra can be expanded into a minimal but full-featured model-view-controller web framework. For example, additional libraries can be attached in order to provide templating, object-relational mapping, and unit testing or behaviour driven development support.

Software built with Scalatra
LinkedIn used Scalatra to power its now-defunct Signal API.
Parts of The Guardian's API services are built in Scalatra.
http://gov.uk has built its API systems using Scalatra.

References

External links

Scalatra's GitHub repository
InfoQ article on Scalatra

Java platform
Free software programmed in Scala
Software using the BSD license
Web frameworks